Björn Kluft (born 11 January 1990) is a German footballer who plays for TVD Velbert.

Career
Kluft, who had initially started out as goalkeeper as a youth player, began his senior career in 2009 at Bayer 04 Leverkusen's reserve team. After one season he moved to 3. Liga side Rot Weiss Ahlen, where he made his professional debut on 31 July 2010 in a game against Werder Bremen II.

After Ahlen's relegation at the end of the season he joined newly promoted 3. Liga side Preußen Münster for 2011–12, where he became a regular starter. He then transferred to 2. Bundesliga side Eintracht Braunschweig for the 2012–13 season. However, due to an injury in his first pre-season friendly with Braunschweig, Kluft missed most of the season. He eventually made his competitive debut for the club on the last matchday of the season, in a 2–2 draw with FSV Frankfurt.

In August 2013, Kluft joined SV Sandhausen in the 2. Bundesliga on a one-year loan deal. In January 2015, he transferred to Rot-Weiss Essen in the Regionalliga West.

References

External links

1990 births
Living people
Sportspeople from Wuppertal
German footballers
Association football midfielders
Bayer 04 Leverkusen II players
Rot Weiss Ahlen players
SC Preußen Münster players
Eintracht Braunschweig players
Eintracht Braunschweig II players
SV Sandhausen players
Rot-Weiss Essen players
FC Erzgebirge Aue players
FC 08 Homburg players
Chemnitzer FC players
SV 19 Straelen players
2. Bundesliga players
3. Liga players
Regionalliga players
Footballers from North Rhine-Westphalia